This is a list of properties and districts in Cobb County, Georgia that are listed on the National Register of Historic Places (NRHP).

Current listings

|}

Former listing

|}

References

Cobb
Buildings and structures in Cobb County, Georgia